Gumtree is a British online classifieds and community website.

Gumtree may also refer to:

 Gum trees, some species of the flowering tree and shrub genus Eucalyptus
 Sapium glandulosum, a species of tree native to the Neotropics
 GumTree, an open source application for scientific experiment